Franck Escalon (born 27 July 1973 in France) is a French retired footballer who now works as a cycling manager and sports therapist at Ponent Mar Hotel in Spain.

Career

Escalon started his senior career with Louhans-Cuiseaux in the 1990s. In 1997, he signed for Ross County in the Scottish Football League Third Division, where he made sixty-nine appearances and scored three goals before retiring in 2001.

References

External links 
 Les tribulations de Franck Escalon, joueur français inconnu, au fin fond de l'Ecosse
 Bonjour, FRANK 
 ESCALON GETS A CHANCE 
 THE ROSS COUNTY TEAM  
 Soccerbase Profile 
 The Stage Archive Profile 
 at Footballdatabase.eu

1973 births
Living people
Expatriate footballers in Scotland
Berwick Rangers F.C. players
Association football midfielders
French expatriate footballers
Ross County F.C. players
Louhans-Cuiseaux FC players
French people of Spanish descent
French footballers